The Battle of Vaal Krantz (5 February to 7 February 1900) was the third failed attempt by General Redvers Buller's British army to fight its way past Louis Botha's army of Boer irregulars and lift the Siege of Ladysmith. The battle occurred during the Second Boer War.

Background
In the first and second attempts at relieving Ladysmith, Buller's army was defeated by Botha and his Boer army at the battles of Colenso and Spion Kop. British casualties soared to 3,000 men, while the Boers lost only a few hundred.

Battle

Vaal Krantz was a ridge of kopjes (small hills) a few miles east of Spion Kop. Buller tried to force a bridgehead across the Tugela River with the Rifle Brigade and Durham Light Infantry (2nd Division) prominent amongst his troops. After three days of skirmishing, the British general found that his position was so cramped that there was no room to drag his superior artillery up to support the British infantry attacks. Buller called a council of war and, "All his generals agreed that there was nothing for it except to try a new attempt elsewhere." Pakenham wrote that the British suffered 333 casualties, but Symonds put the British casualties at 30 dead and 350 wounded with Boers casualties were 30 dead and 50 wounded. Vaal Krantz was a minor defeat. On 14 February with the Battle of the Tugela Heights, Buller launched his fourth attempt at the Relief of Ladysmith and finally succeeded.

Further reading
 Pakenham, Thomas. The Boer War. New York: Avon Books, 1979.

Notes

Battles of the Second Boer War
Conflicts in 1900
1900 in South Africa
History of KwaZulu-Natal
Rifle Brigade (Prince Consort's Own)
February 1900 events